Parapristella aubynei is a freshwater fish in the family Characidae of the order Characiformes. It is a tropical fish. It resides in the coastal drainages of Guyana.

References

Fish described in 1909
Freshwater fish of South America
Characidae